In Meitei mythology and religion, also spelled as , is a guardian dragon lion. It has a lion's body and a dragon's head, with two horns. It is considered sacred to the Meitei heritage.
It is a royal symbol of the Meitei royalties (Ningthouja dynasty).
The most remarkable statues dedicated to "Kangla Sa" stand inside the Kangla.

In Meitei traditional race competitions, winners of the race are declared only after symbolically touching the statue of the dragon "Kangla Sha".

Etymology 

In Meitei language (officially called Manipuri language), the name "Kangla Sha" (originally spelled as "Kangla Sa") is made up of two independent words "Kangla" and "Sa".
The Meitei term "kanglā" is the name of an important historical place in Imphal, Manipur.
The Meitei language term "sā" has multiple meanings based on different parts of speech. As a noun, "sā"  may mean: (1) body, (2) animal or (3) flesh or meat. As a verb, "sā" may mean (1) making, building, preparing, or (2) playing a role, or (3) dancing. As an adjective, "sā" may mean "hot".

History 
 
In the year 1804, Meitei king Chourjit Singh(1803-1813 AD) constructed two huge structures of the "Kangla Sha" dragon lions in front of the Kangla Uttra Shanglen (or simply called the "Uttra") inside the present day Kangla Fort.

During the months of June and July in the year 1844, Meitei king Raja Nara Singh reconstructed the two statues of the Kangla Sha dragons once again.

During the British conquest of the Anglo Manipur War of 1891, the British forces led by Captain Allen demolished the two statues of the Kangla Sha dragons by blasting them by artillery fire into pieces on 20 July 1891.

Later, in the year 2006, the statues of the "Kangla Sa" ("Kangla Sha") were reconstructed by the Government of Manipur. Each statue is 19.30 feet in height, 15.30 feet in length and 6 feet in breadth. The weight of each statue is 36.50 metric tonne. The statues of the Kangla-Sha were sculpted based on the photographs published in the books including "The Lost Kingdom" and "The Meitheis" written by Thomas Callan Hodson. 4 kinds of bricks, found in the ruins of the Old Palace at Canchipur, were used during the construction of the sculptures. It took the craftsmen and sculptors 2 years to complete the construction works.

Before the construction of the real sculptures, to take the comments, feedbacks, opinions and suggestions of the people, Sculptor B Mohendro Sharma presented the prototypes of the Kangla-Sha, made of mud, displayed on the public.

Filming of the bombardment 
On 9 December 2008, after getting permission from the Kangla Fort Board for shooting a film on the history of Kangla, associated with the demolition of the Kangla Sha statues in front of Kangla Uttra Shanglen, the "Manipur Film Development Corporation" (MFDC) Ltd. demolished the prototypes of Kangla Sha with the powerful crackers on 9 December, between 2 PM and 4 PM inside the Kangla.

Removal of rods between jaws 

The action of the removal of rods taken up by the Government of Manipur led by Nongthombam Biren Singh, the Chief Minister of Manipur, and Leishemba Sanajaoba, the Rajya Sabha Member of Parliament, was given positive reactions by the "Lamlai Mapari Thougal Lup" and the "All India Kangla Pakhangba Temple Development Society".

However, this event of the removal of rods drew criticism by RK Nimai, a retired IAS officer, as 
He wrote an article about its criticism in the Imphal Free Press. As a result, many social associations and organisations burnt newspaper copies of the Imphal Free Press.

In a neutral response to the criticism and its reactions, Ethno Heritage Council (HERICOUN) stated:

In reaction to the criticism, there was a strong objection by the "International Sanamahism Students' Association" (ISSA).

Other iconography 
On 17 July 2021, two statues dedicated to the "Kangla Sha", made of bricks, were installed by the 109 BN CRPF under the care of the IGP of Manipur and Nagaland sectors at the main entrance gate to the 109 BN Mongsangei, Imphal West district, Manipur. It was done to pay respect for the Meitei cultural traditions of Manipur. The two bifurcated horns in the heads of each statue, are derived from the  ), the state animal of Manipur, unlike the East Asian and Southeast Asian leogryphs.

Heraldry 

The government of Manipur recognised the illustration of Meitei mythical animal "Kangla Sha" as the state emblem in the year 1980.

Namesakes 
A music band named "Kanglasha" was organised in Imphal in 2007. Its lead singer is Tukun Chongtham, its
lead guitarist is Mantosh Thokchom, its bassist is Sen Thokchom, its keyboard player is Surjit Kshetri and its drum player is Chingkhei Nongthonbam.

See also 
 Pakhangba
 Poubi Lai
 Hiyang Hiren
 Taoroinai
 Lamassu
 Fu Dog

Notes

References

Further reading

External links 

 Kangla Sha at Internet Archive
 Kangla Sha at E-pao.net

Abundance gods
Animal gods
Arts gods
Crafts gods
Creator gods
Earth gods
Fortune gods
Health gods
Horned gods
Kings in Meitei mythology
Life-death-rebirth gods
Magic gods
Maintenance gods
Meitei dragons
Meitei deities
Names of God in Sanamahism
Nature gods
Ningthou
Peace gods
Savior gods
Sky and weather gods
Solar gods
Time and fate gods
Tutelary gods